DRSA may refer to:

Dominance-based rough set approach (theoretical computer science)
 Deutsches Rettungsschwimmabzeichen (the German water-lifesaving grade)